Shola Adewusi  (born 1963) is an English actress of stage, screen and radio.

Her television work includes Little Miss Jocelyn, the BBC comedy sketch show series written by and starring Jocelyn Jee Esien. In addition, Adewusi has appeared on television in ‘Lewis’(Season 3, Episode 4),My Hero, The Bill, Casualty, Bad Girls, Family Affairs, Emmerdale, and Chewing Gum. She is currently starring in CBS's Bob Hearts Abishola as Auntie Olu.

She has also acted in a number of radio productions for the BBC World Service.

Her stage work includes CRAZYBLACKMUTHAFXXKINSELF at the Royal Court Theatre. She also is a member of staff at the Intermission Youth Theatre. She played a cameo part in their hit play "Verona Road".
Her work also includes her role in Paddington 2.

External links

Shola Adewusi at The Spotlight website

Living people
1963 births
21st-century British actresses
Alumni of the Academy Drama School
Black British actresses
English people of Nigerian descent
English people of Yoruba descent
Yoruba actresses